Elabuga Institute (branch) of KFU (Kazan (Volga region) Federal University) is a state educational institution of higher professional education of the Russian Federation.

History 
Elabuga Institute of KFU was established on the foundation of Elabuga State Pedagogical University in 2011.

Its history goes back to the 19th century and can be divided into several periods: the pre-Soviet time period, the Soviet time period, and the modern period.

Pre-Soviet period 
A new educational institution was established in Vaytskaya Province in 1898. The Elabuga merchant Glafira F. Stakheeva subscribed to the building of the Diocesan School for Girls in memory of her husband.
Thinking about the needs of the Orthodox clergy of the Prikamskiy Territory I made up my mind to try and solicit for a theological seminary to be established in Elabuga since it is a main town for 5 districts and 3 provinces – Vaytskaya Province, Ufa Province, and Kazan Province....

The idea of G. F. Stakheeva, in general, received the approval of the Eparchy Assembly, nevertheless the Holy Synod gave permission for the foundation not of a seminary but of the Eparchy School for girls. The building was designed by a first grade architect of the Vyatka province I. A. Charushin. The building was constructed by an architect and artist A. I. Gorokhov. The construction of the building lasted for four years and was finished by August 15, 1903.

The girls of the Eparchy School were taught the basic sciences, religion, etiquette, foreign languages and music. After graduation girls received the status of a home teacher. Attendance of extra classes of the departments of history, physics and mathematics allowed the graduates to become Church school teachers or Eparchy school teachers. Before the October Revolution the Eparchy School has prepared several hundreds of teachers.

Soviet period 
In 1918, the Eparchy School was closed, the same year the Tatar teacher's seminary was opened here. Later, by the decision of the People's Commissariat, Yelabuga Tatar teachers' seminary was transformed into a three-year teacher training courses for the representatives of different national and ethnic groups. Since that time the Russian as well as Mari, Udmurt and Tatar pedagogical courses functioned there.

In August 1923 the Board of Tatar pedagogical courses renamed them into Yelabuga Tatar Pedagogical College. The structure of it constantly expanded and in 1930 it became the Russian-Tatar Pedagogical College (Tekhnicum)

Simultaneously primary school teachers were trained in the college where in 1931–1932 correspondence department was opened.

In 1935 a library department was established within the college which later (in 1937) separated as an independent school.

In 1936–1937 Yelabuga Tatar Pedagogical College was transformed into the Teacher Training College.

In 1939, according to the Decree of the USSR Government the Teachers' Training Institute was founded on the basis of the former Pedagogical College aimed at preparation of qualified middle school teachers.

The students from the nearest 12 districts of the Udmurt and Tatar ASSR were admitted into four faculties: history, physics and mathematics, philology, natural geography.

During World War II, Voronezh University, some laboratories of Leningrad University as well as a branch of the Academy of Sciences of the USSR were evacuated to Yelabuga. They all were housed in the building of Yelabuga Teachers' Training Institute

22 professors, 25 associate professors worked at the institute during the war. During this period such famous figures of sciences as academician V. I. Smirnov,  academician V. A. Fok, future academician V. A. Ambartsumyan, professor V. V. Mavrodin, professor S. I. Kovalyov and others worked here. The first Tatar female — Candidate of Philology M. G. Faizulina began to work in Elabuga in 1941.

During the post war years the teachers' institutes lost their value in connection with a broad development of secondary education and increase of requirements to the level of teachers' qualification. The Elabuga state teacher training institute was formed on the basis of the Elabuga teachers' institute by the resolution of Council of Ministers of RSFSR of August 19, 1952.

Since April 1, 1953, the enrollment of students on two faculties was announced: physical-mathematical and philological. 150 students were accepted for the first course. The next year the correspondence department was opened where 200 students were accepted.

The institute quickly grew, forming the new faculties: pedagogics and techniques of primary education (1959), foreign languages (1965), technical (1975) – the unique faculty during this period in the Volga region – and some others.

Since December, 1973 the 8-month preparatory department was opened at the institute, the main objective of which consisted in preparation working and rural youth for admission to the institute. Thanks to it in 1973 ESTI was regarded by the Ministry of national education of RSFSR as the higher educational institution of the second category, and in 1986 — the first category.

In 1982, for achievements in teacher training ESTI was handed the challenge Red Banner of the Ministry of Education of the USSR and the Central Committee of trade union educators, higher education and research institutions.

Present 
In 2003 the higher educational institution received the new status and was transformed to the Elabuga state pedagogical university.

The structure of university included 2 institutes (the Institute of additional professional education and the Institute of technology, economy and service), 9 faculties (history and law, Russian philology and journalism, physical and mathematical, foreign languages, Tatar and comparative philology, biological, psychology and pedagogics, physical culture, natural humanities); the postgraduate courses were opened on several specialties.

On February 2, 2011, ESTU was attached to the Kazan (Volga) federal university

Till January 22, 2013, the official abbreviated name of higher educational institution was FSAEI HPE of KFU branch in Elabuga. The Elabuga institute of KFU continues pedagogical traditions and is one of the leading scientific and educational centers in Lower Kama.

KFU and French Petroleum Institute signed the agreement on cooperation in 2015.

Structure of higher educational institution 
The management of the institute is exercised by:
 Director
 Deputy Directors
 Academic council
 Board of trustees
 Educational department
 Department of research work
 Department of postgraduate study
 Department of social and educational work
 Management of accounting and financial control
 Selection committee
 Personnel department
As a part of the Elabuga institute there are also 10 faculties, where 23 departments, 4 museums, more than 20 educational, problem and scientific laboratories work.

Faculties 
 Engineering and Technology Faculty
 Foreign Languages Faculty
 Mathematics and Natural Science Faculty
 Psychology and Pedagogy Faculty
 Philology and History Faculty
 Economics and Management Faculty
 Law Faculty

Departments 
 English Philology and Cross Cultural Communications Department
 Biology and Chemistry Department
 World and National History, State History and Law Department
 Foreign Languages Department
 Mathematics and Applied Computer Science Department
 German Philology Department
 General Engineering Training Department
 Pedagogy Department
 Psychology Department
 Russian Language and Contrastive Linguistics Department
 Russian and Foreign Literature Department
 Tatar Philology Department
 Theoretical Foundations of Physical Culture and Life Safety Department
 Theory and Methodology of Teaching Law and Jurisprudence Department
 Theory and Methodology of Professional Education Department
 Criminal Proceedings and Judicial Activities Department
 Physics Department
 Philosophy and Sociology Department
 Private and Public Law Department
 Economics and Management Department

Museums 
 The Museum of Archaeology and History of Tatarstan
 The Museum of History of Elabuga Institute of KFU
 The Museum of Elabuga Merchants
 The Museum of the Tatar language and literature
The most unique historical exhibits are displayed in the Museum of Archaeology and History of Tatarstan and the Museum of Elabuga Merchants. The last one has a collection of original items of merchant life, furniture, records and photographs. The Museum has thematic separation in accordance with key trends of merchant life and economy: merchant's shop, the nook of the ladies' room, merchant's living room. The institute structure also includes Research Department; Postgraduate Studies; Editing and Publishing Complex; Center of Advanced Training, Retraining and Further Education; Educational Resource Center; Scientific Library (its funds have more than 500,000 volumes); Center of Innovative Educational Technologies; Sporting Complex; Sport and Recreation Camp; five educational buildings.

Teaching staff 
On February 21, 2013, the number of faculty members in the Yelabuga Institute CFI was 243 people, including 15 doctors of sciences, professors; 1 PhD ( associate professors), professor; 118 associate professors. Among them there are Honored Scientists of Russia and the Republic of Tatarstan, distinguished workers of Public Education, honored workers of Higher Professional Education of the Russian Federation, honored teachers of the Russian school and RT.

Scientific and educational projects

International Staheev readings 
Staheev readings is the name of the scientific conference, traditionally organized in Yelabuga Institute KFU with the participation of scientists from the metropolitan and regional universities, as well as representatives of the leading scientific schools of near and far abroad (foreign countries).

The name of the conference reflects the cultural and historical heritage of the region and is derived from the names of the famous dynasty of Russian merchants – patrons Staheev and events relating to the construction of the school – building of Yelabuga Institute KFU and the emergence of professional education in Yelabuga.

Staheev readings which began in 1990 were also held in 2003, 2007, 2009, 2011, and 2013 with the participation of the scientists involved in the history of business, the study of classical Russian literature, ethnographers, sociologists. It is a tradition fort Staheev descendants who live in Russia, Britain, France, Australia and Singapore to participate in the conference.

All-Russian National Festival of schoolteachers in Yelabuga 
The first it was organized in August 2010 in Yelabuga State Pedagogical University. The first festival was attended by about 150 teachers from the Republic of Tatarstan and other regions of Russia.

From that time it is spent in Yelabuga Institute KFU each year.

Scientists of Russian and foreign universities, teachers – the winners of the contest "Teacher of the Year in Russia" are invited as moderators.

The festival also includes the exhibition of educational achievements "educational practice" and a "new generation of teachers" project is realized in the frames of the festival.

The festival brings together innovative teachers and secondary education workers, giving them the opportunity to share experiences of innovative educational activities, meet new developments and achievements in the field of educational technologies. The priority of the festival is to study foreign experience. For example, the educators from Singapore (M. Tiruman, the head of the corporation ST Electronics, realizing the state project "Electronic school"; See Sung Lim, Deputy Director of the School Hwa Chong Junior College, realizing the state project "School of the future"), as well as from Latvia, Bulgaria, Germany and so on took part in the festival in different years. d.

Teacher of a new generation 
The main objective of the project is to prepare competitive specialists under the conditions of the modernizing education system.

The participants, mainly senior students of Yelabuga institute undergo additional training taking such courses as English language in professional activity, pedagogical innovation and pedagogical culture. In the total training program special attention is paid to psychological trainings, meetings with leading teachers of the university, of Tatarstan and Russia, leading managers and sociologists of large companies.

Children's university 
Children's university, first of all, is an educational project of Kazan (Volga Region) Federal University. The main objective of the project is to conduct interactive sessions in the popular science lectures form on the history, law, mathematics, chemistry, physics, astronomy, biology, etc., for children 8–14 years by leading professors and lecturers of the university.

First classes of Children's university were held on December 11, 2011, and since they held in Elabuga Institute KFU regularly.

InteLLeto 
The project was created in 2010 on the basis of ESPU (Elabuga State Pedagogical University). Its purpose was to organize outdoor activities and comprehensive development of children between the ages of 7 to 15 years during the school holidays in the form of an intellectual-health camp.

Collaboration between KFU and school 
A number of textbooks for students and teachers of secondary education had been published within the project of Kazan (Volga Region) Federal University "Collaboration between KFU and school" in Elabuga Institute.

There are some winners of various competitions among the benefits:

Elabuga History in Documents and Materials (from ancient times to the beginning of the 20th century) author-originators are Maslova I. V., Krapotkina I. E. – is the winner of the VI Contest «Humanitarian book – 2012" (Kirov) among the teachers of educational institutions of secondary vocational and higher education, post-graduate students of the Volga Federal District in the category "History. Historical sciences";

Collection of tasks on the history of Elabuga (from ancient times to the beginning of the 20th century) author-originators are Maslova I. V., Krapotkina I. E. and others is the winner of the VI Contest "Humanitarian book – 2012" (Kirov) among teachers educational institutions of secondary and higher vocational education, post-graduate students of the Volga Federal District in the category "History. Historical sciences";

Elabuga History in Documents and Materials (from ancient times to the beginning of the 20th century) author-originators are Maslova I. V., Krapotkina I. E. is the winner of KFU Contest, 2012 "Best printed edition of the year" in the nomination "The best textbook of regional studies".

Exercises and test materials on psychology. Author-originators are Panfilov, A. N., Ldokova G. M., Shagivaleeva G. R. – the third place of KFU Contest, 2012 "Best print edition of the year" in humanitarian direction in the section "Best textbook, study guide".

University media 
 Univesti: the official newspaper of Elabuga Institute KFU. Circulation 999 copies. Published monthly, free of charge.
 Flashka: the student newspaper. It issued mainly by students of Russian Philology and Journalism Faculty.
 Shakert: the student newspaper of Tatar and Comparative Philology Faculty.

Student groups

Public organizations and associations 
 Student's club
 Headquarters of labor groups
 Psychological service "Aelita"
 Primary trade-union organization of students
 Student's security service "Forpost"
 Ecological volunteer society of students "EKODOS"
 Sports club
 Archaeological circle
 School of legal education
 School of guides
 School of the young journalist

Creative groups 
 Team of KVN "Gospoda"
 Team of KVN "Mira Avenue"
 Student's chorus
 Vocal group "Academy" and others

Notable alumni 

 Leonid Arslanov, Professor of Elabuga Institute of KFU (philological faculty).
 Saniya Ismagilova, Professor of Elabuga Institute of KFU (philological faculty).
 Naip Lisov, Professor of Elabuga Institute of KFU (philological faculty).
 Leonid Baryshev, a creator of the network of shops "Essen" (technical faculty).
 Alfina Sibgatullina, Doctor of Philology, Professor (philological faculty).
 Rina Zaripova, a journalist, Honored Worker of Culture of the Republic of Tatarstan (philological faculty).

Interesting facts 
• The building of the Yelabuga institute of KFU is an architectural monument and is included in the register of the Yelabuga state memorial estate.

• In May 2013 the agreement on friendship and cooperation in research, educational and other spheres was signed between Kazan (Volga) federal and St. Petersburg state universities. The Yelabuga institute of KFU was symbolically chosen as the place of signing, in memory of the fact that in the period of World War II in the building of higher educational establishment was located the evacuated St. Petersburg State University branch.

Literature
  Academicians at a school desk.//Evening of Elabuga. 2006. No. 46
  Archeology museum has been opened.//Ray of Elabuga. 2003. No. 121
  More than 200 young researchers gathered in the Elabuga institute of KFU.//Evening of Elabuga. 2012. No. 18
  From the year of a teacher — to a century of an enlightenment.//Republic of Tatarstan. 2010. No. 177
  From non-existence.//Eastern express. 2003. No. 40
  Kaviyev A. F., Nasyrova L. V. Eparchy  school for girls in Elabuga — a model of merchant charity.//Third readings devoted to Stakheev: Materials of the International scientific conference. — Elabuga: ESPU publishing house, 2008. Pp. 248 — 251
  Kalimullin A. M., Kornilov I. V. Museum of Elabuga merchantry: traditions of the Russian charity.//Patronage, charity, entrepreneurship and social policy of the state (traditions and present) |Text |: Collection of materials of the All-Russian scientific and practical conference (Kirov, December 4–5, 2006). In 2 t. — Kirov: MFYUA and RUI, 2006. — 2 t. — 
  Scientific achievements of ESPU outgrew borders of Tatarstan and Russia.//New Kama. 2002. No. 16
  The museum will tell about the merchants of Elabuga.//Republic of Tatarstan. 2005. No. 148
  Elabuga state pedagogical university.//Economy, education today. 2007. No. 12
  A meeting of young teachers in Elabuga.//Evening of Elabuga. 2006. No. 39
  Country of full students.//Republic of Tatarstan. — August 12, 2006
  Three very bright days.//Evening of Elabuga. 2012. No. 287

References

External links 

 
 Kazan (Volga) federal university
 Archive of the newspaper Univesti

Kazan Federal University
Teachers colleges in Russia